Daniel Ellis (born 18 November 1988) is an English footballer who played in the Football League for Stockport County. He plays as a forward.

Ellis was born in Stockport. He progressed through Stockport County's Centre of Excellence youth system to make his first-team debut as a substitute in a 3–1 win over Shrewsbury Town in League Two on 22 April 2006. In 2008, he spent time on loan to Conference National club Droylsden. He was released by Stockport at the end of the 2007–08 season.

References

External links

1988 births
Living people
Footballers from Stockport
English footballers
Association football forwards
Stockport County F.C. players
Droylsden F.C. players
English Football League players
National League (English football) players
People educated at Bramhall High School